was a district located in Ōita Prefecture, Japan.

As of 2003, the district had an estimated population of 14,180 and the density of 35.72 persons per km2. The total area was 396.98 km2.

Prior to its dissolution, on March 21, 2005, there were three towns and two villages within the district:
 Amagase
 Ōyama
 Kamitsue
 Maetsue
 Nakatsue

Merger
 On March 22, 2005 - the towns of Amagase and Ōyama, and the villages of Kamitsue, Maetsue and Nakatsue were merged into the expanded city of Hita, and Hita District was dissolved as a result of this merger.

Former districts of Ōita Prefecture